Koppur, also known as Kopra, is a village in Devadurga Taluk in Raichur district, Karnataka State, India.

The village is famous for the temple of Lord Sri Narasimha Swamy. The nearest railway station is Raichur railway station.

References

Villages in Raichur district